Ephrata Commercial Historic District is a national historic district located at Ephrata, Lancaster County, Pennsylvania. The district includes 36 contributing buildings in the central business district of Ephrata.  It has notable examples of the Queen Anne and Italianate architectural styles and buildings designed by noted Lancaster architect C. Emlen Urban.  The oldest building dates to 1808 and is the Eagle Hotel.  Other notable buildings include the I.G. Sprecher & Sons Hardware (1911), Richard Heitler House (1820), J.W. Yost Liquor Store (c. 1880), Ephrata Railroad Station (1887-1889), U.S. Post Office (1937), Ephrata National Bank (1925), and Grant and Wenger Feed Mill (1924). Located in the district is the separately listed Mentzer Building.

It was listed on the National Register of Historic Places in 2006.

References

 

Commercial buildings on the National Register of Historic Places in Pennsylvania
Historic districts on the National Register of Historic Places in Pennsylvania
Italianate architecture in Pennsylvania
Queen Anne architecture in Pennsylvania
Historic districts in Lancaster County, Pennsylvania
National Register of Historic Places in Lancaster County, Pennsylvania